Romanenko is a rural locality (a khutor) in Goncharovskoye Rural Settlement, Pallasovsky District, Volgograd Oblast, Russia. The population was 32 as of 2010.

Geography 
Romanenko is located in steppe, on the Caspian Depression, 70 km southwest of Pallasovka (the district's administrative centre) by road. Gonchary is the nearest rural locality.

References 

Rural localities in Pallasovsky District